Ángel Mullera (Lloret de Mar 1984-) is a Spanish steeplechaser. Prior to the 2012 Olympic Games Mullera was thrown out of the Spanish Olympic team for doping offences but later overturned this at the Court of Arbitration for Sport.

In September 2013 it was announced that Mullera had failed a doping test in the 2013 Spanish athletics national championships. The substance allegedly used by the athlete was corticosteroid.

References

Living people
Athletes (track and field) at the 2012 Summer Olympics
Olympic athletes of Spain
Spanish male steeplechase runners
1984 births
European Athletics Championships medalists